RCDE Stadium, also known as Estadi Cornellà-El Prat, is an all-seater football stadium on the outskirts of Cornellà de Llobregat and El Prat de Llobregat, in the wider Barcelona urban area (Catalonia, Spain). It took three years to build and cost approximately €60 million. Opened in August 2009, it was awarded as Venue of the Year getting the Stadium Business Awards on 18 June 2010 in Dublin.
 
With a capacity of 40,000 seats. it is the 10th-largest stadium in Spain and the 3rd-largest in Catalonia. It became the home of RCD Espanyol in 2009, replacing their previous stadium, the Estadi Olímpic Lluís Companys, being the 8th stadium in the club's history.

History
The stadium is known as the Estadi Cornellà-El Prat because it is located on the borders of the municipalities Cornellà and El Prat. The club hopes to find a buyer for the naming rights for the stadium.

Espanyol defeated Liverpool 3–0 in the stadium's inaugural match on 2 August 2009.

After the death of club captain Daniel Jarque on 8 August 2009, just six days after the inaugural match, it was proposed that the stadium should be renamed in his honour. However, the club has not taken a definite stance on the subject.

In July 2014, the stadium was renamed as Power8 Stadium for sponsorship reasons. It was discovered that Power8 was an investment fraud which duped 100s of Asian investors, organised by Bryan Cook and Thomas Yi of London Capital. In January 2016, the club renamed the stadium as RCDE Stadium ending the sponsorship of Power8.

Other uses 

On 3 July 2010, the stadium received a live concert of American hip hop group The Black Eyed Peas, during The E.N.D World Tour, in front of 30,000 fans.

On 1 June 2019, German metal band Rammstein performed at the stadium as part of their Europe Stadium Tour 2019 with 33,825 fans in attendance.

Gallery

League attendances

This is a list of league games attendances of Espanyol at Cornellà-El Prat.

References

External links

Projecte definitiu estadi de Cornellà - Official video about the new stadium YouTube
RCD Espanyol Official website
Estadios de España 

RCDE
RCDE
Sports venues completed in 2009